Mellahalli  is a village in the southern state of Karnataka, India. It is located in the Maddur taluk of Mandya district in Karnataka.

Demographics
 India census, Mellahalli had a population of 5945 with 3192 males and 2753 females.

Location
Mellahalli is located between Maddur and Malavalli.

References

External links
 http://Mandya.nic.in/

Villages in Mandya district